Bono is an unincorporated community in Helt Township, Vermillion County, in the U.S. state of Indiana.

History
Bono was founded in 1848. The name Bono is said to mean "good".

Geography
Bono is located at  about two miles east of the state line, at the intersection of Indiana State Road 71 and County Road 850 South.  Bono Cemetery is located about a third of a mile west of town.  The area around the town is mostly flat and open farmland; a small tributary of Norton Creek begins at Bono and flows southeast.

References

Unincorporated communities in Vermillion County, Indiana
Unincorporated communities in Indiana